Thomas Walter Francis Newton (1862 – 22 January 1903) was an architect based in Birmingham.

Career
Newton was born in Wiveliscombe, Somerset, United Kingdom in 1862 and educated at Taunton Independent College. He was articled to Frank Barlow Osborn and Alfred Reading in Birmingham,.

He set up in business by himself and entered into partnership with Alfred Edward Cheatle around 1891.

He married Fanny Jane Wakeman in 1890. He died of pneumonia on 22 January 1903 at Quarry Farm, Northfield, Birmingham.

List of works
134 Edmund Street, Birmingham 1895
37 and 39 Church Street, Birmingham 1898
City Arcade, Union Street, Birmingham 1898-1901
121-123 Edmund Street, Birmingham 1899
125-131 St Edward’s Chambers, Birmingham 1899
56-60 Newhall Street, Birmingham 1900
41 and 43 Church Street, Birmingham 1900
95 Cornwall Street, Birmingham 1901
93 Cornwall Street, Birmingham 1902
Fighting Cocks public house, Moseley, Birmingham 1903

References

1862 births
1903 deaths
Architects from Somerset
Architects from Birmingham, West Midlands
People educated at Taunton School
Deaths from pneumonia in England